Foster (also known as Fosters) is an unincorporated community located in Bracken County, Kentucky, United States. Its population was 44 as of the 2010 census, which recorded it as a city; although Foster was once incorporated, it had become unincorporated by 2008.

History
Foster has the name of pioneer citizen Israel Foster. Variant names have been "Fosters Landing" and "Fosters". A post office called Foster's Landing was established in 1847, and the name was changed to Foster in 1850.

References

Unincorporated communities in Bracken County, Kentucky
Unincorporated communities in Kentucky
Former municipalities in Kentucky
Populated places disestablished in 2008